Snap-on Incorporated is an American designer, manufacturer and marketer of high-end tools and equipment for professional use in the transportation industry including the automotive, heavy duty, equipment, marine, aviation, and railroad industries. Headquartered in Kenosha, Wisconsin, Snap-on also distributes lower-end tools under the brand name Blue-Point. Their primary competitors include Matco, Mac Tools, and Cornwell Tools.

Operations
Snap-on Inc. operates plants in Milwaukee, Wisconsin, Elizabethton, Tennessee, and Elkmont, Alabama. Wheel balancers and tire changers are produced in Conway, Arkansas.  Torque products are made and assembled in City of Industry, California. The company manufactures tool storage cabinets in its Algona, Iowa plant. The company's Milwaukee facility manufactures sockets, extension bars, pliers, screwdriver blades and bits.

Snap-on produces hand-held electronic diagnostic tools for the computer systems used in most modern cars and heavy duty vehicles at their Kenosha site. Software development happens in the US, Ireland, Australia, Mexico, Brazil and China. Automotive emissions control diagnostics equipment is produced in its San Jose, California diagnostic facility. Snap-on diagnostic products are sold in Europe and Brazil under the name Sun.

Sales approach

Retail stores do not sell Snap-on tools and are only available through dealers. For Snap-on, shopping for tools has always been time-consuming. With this said, in a van loaded with items for sale, Snap-on franchisees visit their customers' workplace weekly

The Snap-on TechKnow Express is a van that showcases everything Snap-on has to offer in the realm of diagnostic equipment, and the Rock 'n Roll Cab Express is a truck with various types of tool storage showing customization options, including units larger than what can fit on a standard franchisee van. These trucks are typically assigned to a particular region and work within that region with individual franchisees.

History
Snap-on was founded as the Snap-on Wrench Company in Milwaukee, Wisconsin in 1920 by Joseph Johnson and William Seidemann. The business manufactured and marketed ten sockets that would "snap on" to five interchangeable handles. The company's slogan was "5 do the work of 50". In 1930, the company's headquarters moved to Kenosha, Wisconsin.

After World War II, Stanton Palmer advertised for a military officer to organize and develop a larger sales force for the expected post war sales boom. Newton Tarble was hired, and came up with the idea of developing routes for company dealers to see mechanics on a weekly basis. Eventually these salesmen became independent businessmen and authorized dealers using larger walk in vans to carry a growing product line.

In 1956, the company continued to expand with the use of test equipment and wheel service products. This was the start of the companies jump into manufacturing automotive test equipment into the Snap-On line. Equipment included Voltmeters, Ammeters, Disruptors, and Alternator Testers.

The company opened their wrench forging plant in Elizabethton, Tennessee in 1974. The next year, Snap-on opened a manufacturing plant in Johnson City, Tennessee and closed the plant in 2007.

In 1998, workers at the company's Milwaukee plant voted to join the Teamsters labor union and the company expanded the facility in 2013. Also in 1998, the company began a partnership with Lowe's home improvement chain retailer to produce their Kobalt line of tools.

In 2010, the Murphy, North Carolina plant was named one of the top 10 plants in North America by IndustryWeek. In 2011, J.H. Williams & Co was officially renamed Snap-on Industrial Brands.

In 2022, the company announced an expansion to its Milwaukee facility to expand its hand tool business.

Acquisitions 
In 2014, the company acquired New Hampshire–based Pro-Cut for $42 million.

In October 2016, the company acquired Car-O-Liner Holding AB, a Swedish collision repair tool company, for $155 million. Later that year, the company acquired Sturtevant Richmont for $13 million.

In May 2017, the company acquired Norbar Torque Tools Holdings Limited for $72 million.

In September 2020, the company acquired AutoCrib Inc. based in Tustin, California for $36 million.

In March 2021, Snap-on acquired Canada-based Dealer-FX Group for $200 million.

Racing sponsorships
The company has sponsored Penske Racing teams in the NASCAR Cup Series and Xfinity Series as well as IndyCar. The first driver Snap-on became associated with was Rick Mears in 1979. Since 1992, Snap-on has sponsored Cruz Pedregon. In 2004, the company began sponsoring Cruz’s brother Tony Pedregon. Snap-on has also sponsored Repsol Honda Team in MotoGP since 1998.

Snap-on sponsored NHRA drag racer Doug Herbert from 1992 until 2008. For the 2010 racing season, the company sponsored Penske Racing.

References

External links

Automotive tool manufacturers
Manufacturing companies established in 1920
Companies listed on the New York Stock Exchange
Goods manufactured in the United States
Kenosha, Wisconsin
Manufacturing companies based in Wisconsin
Tool manufacturing companies of the United States
1920 establishments in Wisconsin
Companies based in Wisconsin